Mixocera is a genus of moths in the family Geometridae described by Warren in 1901.

Species
Mixocera latilineata (Walker, 1866) Australia
Mixocera parvulata (Walker, [1863]) India, Sri Lanka
Mixocera katharinae Hausmann, 1997 Zaire, Rhodesia, Kenya, Tanzania, Mozambique, South Africa
Mixocera wiedenorum Hausmann, 1997 Madagascar
Mixocera albimargo Warren, 1901 Nigeria
Mixocera ledermanni Hausmann, 1997 Nigeria, Upper Volta
Mixocera albistrigata (Pagenstecher, 1893) Natal, Tanzania, Rwanda, Kenya
Mixocera frustratoria (Wallengren, 1863) South Africa

References

Microloxiini